Sriwijaya University (abbreviated as UNSRI) is a research, teaching and learning center which has contributed significantly in the development and advancement of sciences, technologies, arts and cultures.
Being one of the major state universities in Indonesia, Sriwijaya University's initial campus is located in Palembang, the capital of South Sumatera Province, and the second campus is located in Indralaya, Ogan Ilir Regency approximately 32 km away from Palembang.

UNSRI obtained the accreditation "Very Good (A)" awarded by the National Accreditation Board of Higher Education (abbreviated as BAN-PT).

History

The idea to establish a college in South Sumatra had been around since the early 1950s and was prompted on Independence Day celebration on August 17, 1952. At the end of August 1952, the faculty of economics was established under some considerations. Thus, South Sumatera’s Faculty Committee for Economics was set up and then managed by a foundation established on the 1st of April 1953. It was named  (Syakhyakirti Higher Education Foundation).

This Faculty was officially opened on October 31, 1953 in a ceremony attended by Mr. Hadi, Secretary General of the Ministry of Education Teaching and Culture (KDP), Drg. M. Isa (Governor of South Sumatera), Bambang Utoyo (Commander of the Sriwijaya II TT), and Ali Gathmyr (Chairman of the Parliament of South Sumatera).

The Foundation of Higher Education Syakhyakirti continued the efforts to establish the university by organizing  (Law Faculty Committee). It was inaugurated as ‘Faculty of Law and Public Knowledge’ on November 1, 1957, coinciding with the celebration of Dies Natalis IV of Economics Faculty.

The progress was sustained by the help of Military Authorities Territorial II Sriwijaya that provided financial assistance to construct a permanent building of Syakhyakirti Higher Education Foundation in Bukit Besar (now Bukit Besar’s Campus of Sriwijaya University). The cornerstone laying ceremony took place on October 31, 1957.

The next effort was state validation of the existing college. With the persistent efforts of community leaders of South Sumatera, like Colonel Harun Sohar (A Commander as well as Chairman of Paperda TT II/Sriwijaya) and A. Bastari (Governor), the obstacles of building the university could be overcome. Then, in December 1959, a delegation was sent to Jakarta to meet the Minister of KDP (Mr. Moh. Yamin) where they managed to obtain the Government willingness guarantee for taking over Syakhyakirti college to become a state university. Under the Government Regulation no. 42 of 1960 dated October 29, 1960 (State Archive year 1960 no.135) Sriwijaya University was officially inaugurated on the 3rd of November 1960 and President Sukarno ceremonially signing the charter witnessed by Minister of KDP (Mr. Priyono) and several Ambassadors of the fellow countries. Drg. M Isa was appointed with Presidential Decree No. 696/M of 1960 dated 29 October 1960 as the first President of the University.

To meet the development demands, Sriwijaya University planned to expand the campus area by opening an area of 712 hectares in Indralaya, Ogan Komering Ilir (Now Ogan Ilir- OI), in 1982. The development of this new campus building started in 1983. The development of the campus started in 1989 and ended in 1993.

The South Sumatera’s Governor at that time, Ramli Hasan Basri H, gave his inaugural lecture on Indralaya campus on September 1, 1993. The utilization of the facilities of Sriwijaya University in Indralaya was fully implemented with the issuance of the Decree of the Rector in January 1995 which stipulated that started from February 1, 1995 all activities of administration and most of the academic activities of Sriwijaya University were held on Indralaya campus. The Inauguration of Sriwijaya University’s new campus in Indralaya was officially held on March 6, 1997 by President Suharto.

Location and facilities

The campus is located in Palembang (Palembang campus) and Indralaya (Indralaya campus).
 Palembang Campus:
 Jl. Srijaya Negara Bukit Besar, Palembang, South Sumatera, Indonesia 30139
 Faculty of Medicine: Jl. Dr. Mohd. Ali Komp. RSMH Palembang, South Sumatera, Indonesia 30126
 Graduate School of Sriwijaya University: Jl. Padang Selasa No.524 Bukit Besar, Palembang, South Sumatera Indonesia 30139
 Indralaya Campus:
 Jl. Raya Palembang-Prabumulih Km. 32, Indralaya Ogan Ilir 30662, South Sumatera, Indonesia

The inter campus transportation for students and staffs are Buses (UNSRI’s buses and Trans musi buses) and Trains. For internal transportation within Indralaya, the campus offers free shuttle buses.

Student facilities:

 Libraries
 Sport Venues
 ICT Services
 Dormitories and Boarding
 Student Center
 Health Clinic
 Camping Ground

Faculties
The university has 10 faculties, in bachelor's degree:

 Faculty of Economics
 Faculty of Law
 Faculty of Engineering
 Faculty of Medicine
 Faculty of Agriculture
 Faculty of Teacher Training and Education
 Faculty of Social Science and Political Science
 Faculty of Mathematics and Natural Science
 Faculty of Computer Science
 Faculty of Public Health

And for master degrees some of them are:

 Mechanical Engineering
 Biology
 Physics
 Chemical Engineering
 Business 
 Agriculture
 Civil Engineering
 Education 
 Management

Campuses

Sriwijaya University has two main campuses, namely in Indralaya, Ogan Ilir and in Bukit Besar, Palembang. Bukit Besar campus Palembang breadth 32.5 acres, used as an educational facility program S0 ( D3 ), S2 and S3, and S1 Class Palembang .
Main campus with an area of 712 acres Indralaya located 38 kilometers to the south of the city of Palembang, an Activity Center for Education bachelor's degree ( S1 ) . On campus there are also Indralaya Administration Headquarters ( KPA ), Central Library, Institute of Languages, Institute of Research, Institute of Community Services, Computer Center, Student Activity Center, Community Health Center, Health Clinic, and University Fire Station .
UNSRI also has the Experimental Farm of 50 hectares in area Gelumbang, Muara Enim ( 62 kilometers south of Palembang ) . UNSRI also has a campus of the Faculty of Medicine at the Hospital Complex Mohammad Hoesin (Rumah Sakit Mohammad Hoesin, abbreviated as RSMH) Palembang, Guidance and Counseling at Campus Road Srijaya KM5.5 Palembang, and the Graduate College at Jalan Bukit Padang Selasa Raya Palembang .

Trans Musi Bukit Besar campus that caters to the Main Campus in Indralaya Students train Sriwijaya University.

References

External links
  

Palembang
 
Educational institutions established in 1960
1960 establishments in Indonesia
Indonesian state universities